Reema Juffali, also spelt either as Reema Al Juffali or Reema Al-Juffali (born 18 January 1992), is a Saudi Arabian professional racing car driver who competes in the International GT Open with her own team, Theeba Motorsport. She is the first-ever Saudi Arabian woman racing driver, the first Saudi woman to hold a racing license and also the first Saudi woman to win an international motor race. In November 2019, she became the country's first woman racing car driver to take part in an international racing competition in the Kingdom of Saudi Arabia.

In 2022, she was named as one of the BBC's 100 Women – a list of 100 inspiring and influential women from across the world.

Early life and education 
Juffali was born and raised in Jeddah. As a child, she took an interest in cars and sports. Her interest was deemed to be ironic as the country strictly banned women to engage in driving at that time. She completed her primary education at the British International School of Jeddah. Juffali pursued her higher studies on International Affairs at the Northeastern University in 2010.

Racing career

After graduation, Juffali obtained a driving license in October 2010 as she passed her driving test in the US. She obtained her racing license in September 2017, after the women to drive movement successfully ended the ban on women drivers in Saudi Arabia that same month. Her debut race as a professional racer came in October 2018 and she registered her major career victory in December 2018.

In April 2019, Juffali represented Saudi Arabia in 2019 F4 British Championship at Brands Hatch that was her first appearance in a competitive racing event at the F4 British Championship.

On 22 November 2019, she became the first Saudi Arabian woman to compete in an international racing competition in Saudi Arabia, taking part in the first round of the 2019-20 Jaguar I-Pace eTrophy as a guest driver. The race was held at the Riyadh Street Circuit. She competed in the 2020 Formula 4 UAE Championship, and the 2021 GB3 Championship.

In 2022, Juffali founded her own team, Theeba Motorsport, to improve Saudi Arabian access and participation in motorsport by creating a series of educational internship and apprenticeship programmes. The team competes in the Pro-Am class of the International GT Open and intends to become the first Saudi racing team to compete at the 24 Hours of Le Mans.

Awards and recognition
In 2022, Juffali was named as one of the BBC's 100 Women – a list of 100 inspiring and influential women around the world – alongside singer-songwriter Billie Eilish, First Lady of Ukraine, Olena Zelenska and actress, Priyanka Chopra.

Racing record

Career summary

* Season still in progress.

Complete F4 British Championship results
(key) (Races in bold indicate pole position) (Races in italics indicate fastest lap)

Complete Formula 4 UAE Championship results 
(key) (Races in bold indicate pole position; races in italics indicate fastest lap)

Complete GB3 Championship results 
(key) (Races in bold indicate pole position) (Races in italics indicate fastest lap)

See also 
List of female racing drivers

References

External links 
 

1992 births
Living people
Saudi Arabian racing drivers
Reema
British F4 Championship drivers
Female racing drivers
Juffali family
Northeastern University alumni
People from Jeddah
Saudi Arabian expatriates in the United States
Saudi Arabian expatriates in England
Saudi Arabian expatriates in the United Kingdom
MRF Challenge Formula 2000 Championship drivers
International GT Open drivers
Double R Racing drivers
24H Series drivers
BBC 100 Women
UAE F4 Championship drivers